The Devil's Rock is a 2011 New Zealand horror film produced by Leanne Saunders, directed by Paul Campion, written by Campion, Paul Finch, and Brett Ihaka, and starring Craig Hall, Matthew Sunderland, Gina Varela, and Karlos Drinkwater. It is set in the Channel Islands on the eve of D-Day and tells the story of two New Zealand commandos who discover a Nazi occult plot to unleash a demon to win World War II. The film combines elements of war films and supernatural horror films. The film was theatrically released on 8 July 2011 in the United Kingdom and 22 September 2011 in New Zealand.

Plot

On 5 June 1944, a unit of New Zealand commandos are sent to the Channel Islands on sabotage and distraction raids, to draw the German military's attention away from Operation Overlord, planned landings in Normandy.  That night, two New Zealand soldiers, Captain Ben Grogan and Sergeant Joe Tane, paddle in their Klepper canoe to Forau Island, landing on a beach covered in anti-personnel mines and tank traps. When they leave the beach and head inland, they hear distant screaming and gunfire. They approach a German fortification and hear what they think is a man being tortured. They climb down into a large gun pit and place explosives on a large artillery gun but are disturbed when a German soldier runs out of a tunnel pleading for help. Grogan stabs the soldier in the back of the neck and kills him. Grogan investigates a woman's screaming inside the bunker while Tane remains outside.  When Tane hears a gunshot, he investigates. While looking for Grogan, he discovers a book of black magic and, distracted by its contents, is killed by an unseen assailant. Grogan, unharmed, later discovers Tane's body but is immediately knocked unconscious.

Grogan wakes and is briefly tortured by a Nazi, Colonel Meyer, who wants to know his mission. During the interrogation, Grogan hears a woman screaming from another room. He eventually escapes and chases Meyer into the tunnels, shooting and injuring him. Upon tracking the woman's screams to a room covered in occult symbols, Grogan discovers that the woman is his dead wife, Helena. Meyer enters the room and shoots Grogan in the leg, then shoots Helena in the head, apparently killing her. Grogan attacks Meyer, who explains the woman is a demon, summoned from a book of black magic found on the island. Meyer proves this by offering her the leg of a dead German to eat; she changes into her true demon form as she eats the leg.

After Grogan removes a bullet from his abdomen, Meyer passes out. Grogan searches him and discovers a page torn from the book of black magic in a small pouch worn as a necklace. Grogan keeps the page after replacing it with another from the book. Soon after, Meyer recovers and explains the demon is a shapeshifter and a weapon the Germans plan to use against the Allies. He says that the demon is confined to the island because it cannot cross moving water. However, Meyer now realizes the demon poses too great a threat to the world. Meyer offers to give the book to Grogan if he will help him escape from Germany. Meyer persuades Grogan to help him perform a ritual to dispel the demon back to Hell. Meyer, believing he is protected by the incantation sheet from the book, betrays Grogan at the end of the ritual.

As Meyer reveals his true intent to use the demon for the Nazis, Grogan overpowers Meyer and throws him to the demon, who brutally kills him. When she tries to convince Grogan to take her with him as Helena, he tells her that she could never replace the real Helena, and he chains her up again. Unable to complete the ritual alone, Grogan takes the book and leaves the demon behind, to prey on any Germans that come to investigate. He explains to the demon that he intends to come back when the war is over to finish the ritual and to banish her forever.  He leaves the key to the chain within reach as he leaves the demon in the bunker. He steps onto the beach, buries a photo of Helena he kept with him, and watches as D-Day begins. In the post credits scene, a German soldier can be seen entering the tower, and witnessing dismembered body parts as well as the chain the demon was chained to unlocked. Behind him is the demon, having taken the form of a presume deceased loved one of the soldier. The demon starts interacting with him as its voice slowly begins to change to its demonic one.

Cast

Production

The film was produced by New Zealand producer Leanne Saunders and co-funded by the New Zealand Film Commission. Although set in Europe, the film was shot over 15 days in August 2010 in Wellington, New Zealand, on sets built at Island Bay Studio, on location at Breaker Bay, and at Wrights Hill Fortress, a semi-restored World War II hilltop fortification. Special makeup effects for the film were created by Weta Workshop.

Historical references

The film contains references to real historical events, and Campion has stated that he based the story on the German occupation of the Channel Islands. Guernsey's history of witchcraft and the occult includes the existence of the "Bad Books" (books of black magic), and copies can be found in two libraries in the Channel Islands. When Grogan and Tane hear screaming from within the fortification, Grogan thinks it is other allied commandos who are being tortured, stating, "You know what they did to Blondie's men in Bordeaux", a reference to the torture of captured Royal Marines during Operation Frankton under the command of Major Herbert 'Blondie' Hasler. As Meyer ties Grogan's thumbs with a piece of wire to torture him, Meyer talks about the Allied "gangster commandos, who raided these very islands and killed innocent German prisoners with their hands tied behind their backs", which is a reference to Operation Basalt, a British Commando raid on Sark during which a German prisoner was shot dead whilst his hands were tied, which in turn led to Adolf Hitler issuing his Commando Order, upon which the torture scene in the film is based. When Meyer is attempting to interrogate Grogan, he taunts Grogan's New Zealand background: "New Zealanders, a bunch of farmers driving around the deserts of North Africa, attacking by night and fleeing to hide like cowards", which is a reference to the New Zealand section of the Long Range Desert Group. Meyer also taunts Grogan by insulting the Maoris of New Zealand, which he describes as "the descendents of cannibals and headhunters", which is a reference to a 1940s German radio propaganda broadcast.

Release
Metrodome bought the UK rights in 2010 while the film was still in post production. The film was released in theatres and video-on-demand services on 8 July 2011 and on DVD on 11 July 2011. The film was released in 21 cinemas New Zealand on 22 September 2011 and was released on DVD and Blu-ray in December 2011. Entertainment One bought the North American rights at the 2011 Cannes Film Festival.

Film festival screenings

 Fantasia International Film Festival – Montreal, Canada, August 2011
 Icon TLV Film Festival – Tel-Aviv, Israel, September 2011
 Ramskrik Film Festival – Norway, October 2011
 San Sebastian Horror & Fantasy Film Festival – San Sebastian, Spain, October 2011
 Yubari International Fantastic Film Festival – Yubari, Japan, February 2012
 A Night of Horror International Film Festival – Sydney, Australia, March 2012
 Zinema Zombie Fest – Bogotá, Colombia, November 2012
 BFX Festival 2015 - Bournemouth UK, October 2015

Critical response

Tony Lee wrote in Black Static, "Although it's a Kiwi production, The Devil's Rock feels like a more worthy successor to the Hammer Film Productions studios ethos than actual new Hammer-label product such as The Resident."

Awards
The film was nominated for Best Visual Effects and Best Costume Design, and won for Best Makeup Design at the 2012 Sorta Unofficial New Zealand Film Awards.

References

External links
 
 
 The Devil's Rock at Paul Campion's website
 Festung Guernsey – German Fortifications of Guernsey
 Sorta Film Awards – Sorta Unofficial New Zealand Film Awards

2011 films
2011 horror films
New Zealand horror films
Wellington
Demons in film
Horror war films
Supernatural war films
World War II films
New Zealand independent films
2010s supernatural horror films
Films about witchcraft
War adventure films
Films set in 1944
Films set in the Channel Islands
2010s monster movies
Operation Overlord films
2010s English-language films
Films set in bunkers